K. Juno (Japanese: K.ジュノ) is a rock singer and songwriter from Japan. She is known for lyricist in Voices of a Distant Star.

Filmography

Music style 
As a vocalist, Juno sings like a 1980s hard rock singer, while she writes rather 1970s rock flavored music. Juno also wrote the lyrics to the theme song for the Japanese CG animation Voices of a Distant Star by Makoto Shinkai, titled "Through the Years and Far Away (Hello, Little Star)".

Discography

Solo albums 
 Love Me (2000, mini album, 5 tracks)
 Juno Vol. 1 plus Fate (2005, 10 tracks)
 Amazing Grace (Out of the Holy Hands of Fate) (2007, CD-R, 4 tracks) (sung in Japanese)

Singer/songwriter albums

Wave (Morrigan)
 Feline Groove II (2003, 1 new / 16 tracks)
 Voyager (2004, 1 new / 1 remix / 10 tracks plus bonus)
 Mo Nakanaide (2004, 2 new / 9 tracks)
 Avalon (2004, 3 new / 16 tracks; album arranged for Fate/stay night)
 Caldes (2005, 3 new / 16 tracks)
 Aria (2006, 1 new / 14 tracks)
 White Avalon (2006, 4 new / 22 tracks)
 Yoru o Koete (2007, 1 new / 2 remix / 8 tracks)
 Archiv-East (2007, 1 remix / 38 tracks)
 Message (2007, 4 new/9 remix/13 tracks, all sung by K. Juno)

Cranky
 Rave-Slave (2003, 1 remix / 14 tracks)

PsG System Laboratory
 Artifact (2003, 3 new / 39 tracks; Tsukinosabaki & Typing Moon Online original soundtrack)
 Typing Moon (2003, online typing game)

Fusion Works
 Aura - 12 Pieces of Remedy (2006, 1 new / 12 tracks)

Kenichi Kitakata
 Believe (2007, CD-R, backup vocals)

As a lyricist 
 Voices of a Distant Star soundtrack CD, DVD

References

External links 
 K. Juno on sure rock.net 
 K. Juno on IMDB
 Juno's Rock and Roll Paradise! 

Year of birth missing (living people)
Living people
Japanese women rock singers
Japanese women singer-songwriters
Japanese women pop singers
Musicians from Osaka
20th-century Japanese women singers
20th-century Japanese singers
21st-century Japanese women singers
21st-century Japanese singers